The Brachybasidiaceae are a family of fungi in the Basidiomycota, Exobasidiales order. Species in the family have a widespread distribution, especially in tropical and temperate regions of the world. Members of the Brachybasidiaceae are plant pathogens that grow on the leaves of plants such as palms, grasses, sedges, and spiderwort species.

References

External links

Ustilaginomycotina
Fungal plant pathogens and diseases
Basidiomycota families